Charles Vane (c. 1680 – 29 March 1721) was an English pirate who operated in the Bahamas during the end of the Golden Age of Piracy.

Vane was likely born in the Kingdom of England around 1680. One of his first pirate ventures was under the leadership of Henry Jennings, during Jennings' attack on the salvage camp for the wrecked Spanish 1715 Treasure Fleet off the coast of Florida. By 1717, Vane was commanding his own vessels and was one of the leaders of the Republic of Pirates in Nassau. In 1718, Vane was captured but agreed to stop his criminal actions and declared his intention to accept a King's Pardon; however just months later he and his men, including Edward England and Jack Rackham, returned to piracy. Unlike some other notable pirate captains of the age like Benjamin Hornigold and Samuel Bellamy, Vane was known for his cruelty, often beating, torturing and killing sailors from ships he captured. In February 1719, Vane was caught in a storm in the Bay Islands and was marooned on an uncharted island. Upon being discovered by a passing British ship, he was arrested and brought to Port Royal where he was eventually tried and hanged in March 1721.

Pirate career

Little is known of Vane's early life. He lived in Port Royal before becoming a pirate, but he was most likely not born there.

Vane worked with Henry Jennings during Jennings' attack on the salvage camp for the wrecked Spanish 1715 Treasure Fleet. Vane first operated as an independent captain in the summer of 1717. By the winter of that year he was one of the leaders of the pirates operating out of Nassau.

When word reached the pirates that King George I of Great Britain had extended an offer of pardon to all pirates who wished to surrender, Vane led the pirates who opposed taking the pardon, which included many with Jacobite leanings. Vane was captured along with his sloop, the Lark. Benjamin Hornigold, Thomas Nichols, and others urged Pearse to release Vane as a show of good faith, which he did; Vane afterwards declared to Pearse that he intended to take the King's pardon. But on 21 March, Vane and his men (including Edward England and Calico Jack Rackham) turned pirate again, capturing a Jamaican sloop. Vane sailed back to Nassau and harassed Pearse repeatedly, trading their sloop for the Lark. Vane left Nassau on 4 April; four days later Pearse left with HMS Phoenix, and Nassau was again controlled by the pirates.

After leaving Nassau, Vane raided ships around the Bahamas. He gained a reputation for cruelty; he and his crew would often beat or torture captured sailors to force them to surrender their valuables. Around this time Vane's crew renamed the Lark, calling it the Ranger.

Vane cruised again in May and June, capturing, among other ships, a twenty-gun French ship that became Vane's new flagship.

Vane was back at Nassau on 22 July 1718 when Woodes Rogers reached Nassau to take office as the new governor. Rogers' ships trapped Vane in the harbor; Vane's ship was too large to pass one of the harbor's two entrances, and the other was blocked by Rogers' fleet. That night, Vane turned the French ship into a fireship, setting it on fire and sailing it towards Rogers' ships. The fireship failed to damage any of Rogers' fleet except one, but the ships were forced to pull away, unblocking the channel. Vane commandeered a small 24 gun sloop, the Katherine, and escaped out the smaller entrance as Rogers' ships returned.

Vane took ships off the Bahamas in July, working with Charles Yeats, the original captain of the Katherine. A brigantine that Vane captured became his new flagship. In August he sailed to Charleston and took eight ships there. After seizing a slave ship, he put the slaves aboard Yeats' ship; Yeats sailed off with the slaves and surrendered to the governor of South Carolina in exchange for a pardon. The merchants of Charleston outfitted two sloops to hunt Vane, under the command of William Rhett. Rhett failed to find Vane, but his ships located and captured the pirate Stede Bonnet.

In August Vane careened his ship near Abaco, where his accomplice Nicholas Woodall smuggled him supplies and ammunition. Hornigold had turned pirate-hunter along with his associate John Cockram and followed Vane, who escaped; Hornigold and Cockram instead captured Woodall, who was imprisoned by Rogers.

Vane returned to Nassau in September to marry, threatening to retake the city. In October Vane sailed to Ocracoke Inlet, and met with Blackbeard, perhaps attempting to convince Blackbeard to join forces with him; the two crews celebrated for several days, but split up afterwards.

In October Vane raided Eleuthera, carrying away liquor and livestock. On 23 November, Vane spotted a large frigate, but when he hoisted the Jolly Roger the frigate replied by raising a French naval ensign and opening fire. Vane's brigantine and sloop were outgunned, and he ordered a retreat. Vane's crew saw this as an act of cowardice. He was voted out of command in favor of Calico Jack Rackham. Vane and sixteen others who supported him, including his first mate Robert Deal, were put on the sloop.

Vane sailed to the Bay Islands, capturing sloops along the way, one of which Deal took command of. In February 1719, Vane and Deal were caught in a hurricane and separated; Vane was wrecked on an uninhabited island. When English ships arrived to collect water near the island, Vane tried to join one of the crews under a false name. He was recognized by an old acquaintance, and arrested.

Vane was taken to Spanish Town, Jamaica and held in prison for some time. On 22 March 1721, he was tried for piracy and found guilty. Vane learned that Deal had been tried, convicted, and hanged some time earlier. Vane was sentenced to death, and on 29 March he was hanged at Gallows Point in Port Royal. His corpse was hung in chains at Gun Cay.

In popular culture
W. Morgan Sheppard portrayed Vane in the 1999 family film Treasure of Pirate's Point.

Vane appears as a side character and minor antagonist in the 2013 video game Assassin's Creed IV: Black Flag, in which he was voiced by Ralph Ineson. In the game, Vane is portrayed as rude, foul-mouthed, and self-centered, but despite this, he becomes a friend and ally of protagonist Edward Kenway and one of the co-leaders of the Pirate Republic in Nassau. Following the Republic's collapse, Vane and Kenway team up to search for the Observatory, which the latter believes will enrich them, only to end up marooned together on an island following a mutiny staged by Vane's quartermaster, Jack Rackham. During their time on the island, Vane is driven insane, to the point he tries to kill Kenway, who defeats and subsequently abandons him. In a later mission, Kenway can encounter Vane in prison, revealing that the latter was captured and sentenced to death. Though he considers saving him, Kenway ultimately leaves Vane to his fate, deeming him too far gone.

Zach McGowan portrayed Charles Vane in the Starz television series Black Sails (2014–2017).

Tom Padley plays Vane in six episodes of the 2021 Netflix docuseries The Lost Pirate Kingdom.

Footnotes

References 

 
 Menefee, S.P. "Vane, Charles," in Oxford Dictionary of National Biography, vol. 56 (2004): pp. 94–95.
 Pickering, David. Pirates. CollinsGem. HarperCollins Publishers, New York, NY. (2006):p-75.
 

1680 births
1721 deaths
British pirates
People executed for piracy
English Jacobites